Casablanca, Casablanca is a 1985 Italian comedy film written, directed and starred by Francesco Nuti. It is the sequel of The Pool Hustlers.

For his performance Nuti won the David di Donatello for best actor.

Plot summary 
Francesco, nicknamed the "Toscano", is a musician who plays in the orchestra with his girlfriend Chiara. But one day Chiara receives a job offer at Casablanca. She then leaves from Tuscany with his conductor, said "the Dark". Francesco gets angry, because he believes that between the two there is a love affair, and chases them in Casablanca.

Cast 

Francesco Nuti as Francesco Piccioli aka "il Toscano"		
Giuliana De Sio as Chiara
Daniel Olbrychski as Daniel, Chiara's lover	
 Domenico Acànfora as  Acànfora		
 Marcello Lotti as lo Scuro		
Carlo Monni as the barman	
Novello Novelli as Merlo	
Clarissa Burt

See also  
 List of Italian films of 1985

References

External links

1985 films
Italian comedy films
Films directed by Francesco Nuti
1985 comedy films
1985 directorial debut films
Films with screenplays by Sergio Donati
Films with screenplays by Luciano Vincenzoni
Films set in Tuscany
Films set in Casablanca
Films about music and musicians
Films about infidelity
1980s Italian-language films
1980s Italian films